HMS Nelson was a 126-gun first rate ship of the line of the Royal Navy, launched on 4 July 1814 at Woolwich Dockyard, but then laid up incomplete at Portsmouth until 1854, when work began with a view to commissioning her for service in the Crimean War, but this ended before much work had been done, and the ship returned to reserve.

In 1865, Nelson was given to the colony of Victoria as a training ship, and she was finally outfitted and rigged for £42,000 and sailed for Australia in October 1867. Travelling via the Cape of Good Hope, she arrived in February 1868. She was the first ship to dock in the newly constructed Alfred Graving Dock. Her armament in 1874 was listed as two 7-in RML, twenty 64 lb guns, twenty 32 lb guns and six 12 lb howitzers.

During 1879–1882, Nelson was further cut down to a single deck and her rig reduced to the main mast only, the ship being reclassified as a frigate. Her old armament was partly replaced by modern breech-loaders. She was laid up at Willamstown in 1891, her boilers being removed in 1893. On 28 April 1898 she was put up for auction and sold to Bernard Einerson of Sydney for £2,400.

In 1900 Nelson was cut down yet again to create a coal lighter that kept the name Nelson, the upper timbers being used to build a drogher named Oceanic.

In 1908 Nelson was sold to the Union Steamship Co. of New Zealand, and in July was towed from Sydney to Beauty Point on the Tamar River, Tasmania, for use as a coal storage hulk. She later foundered there with 1,400 tons of coal on board and remained submerged for forty days until finally refloated.

In January 1915 she was towed to Hobart for further service as a coal hulk, until sold in August 1920 to Mr. H Gray for £500 and towed an up river to Shag Bay. for gradual breaking up, work continuing into the 1930s, although some of her timbers still survive.

The ship's figurehead was preserved by the NSW Naval Brigade, then the Royal Australian Navy, before it was presented to the Australian National Maritime Museum for display.

Several RML 64-pounder 58 cwt guns (Rifled Muzzle Loader, converted 32-pounder smoothbores) from Nelson can be found scattered around the State of Victoria, Australia in public areas, as well as two on military premises at Victoria Barracks, Melbourne, and one at Fort Queenscliff.

Notes

References

Lavery, Brian (2003) The Ship of the Line - Volume 1: The development of the battlefleet 1650-1850. Conway Maritime Press. .
Jones, Colin (1986) Australian Colonial Navies Australian War Memorial,

External links

HMVS Nelson SlideShow

Ships of the line of the Royal Navy
Nelson-class ships of the line
Coal hulks
1814 ships
Maritime incidents in 1908